Haldimand may refer to:

People
 Frederick Haldimand (1718–1791), Swiss-born army officer and governor of Quebec
 Peter Frederick Haldimand (1741 or 1742–1765), Swiss-born British army officer and surveyor
 William Haldimand (1784–1862), director of Bank of England
 Haldimand S. Putnam (1835–1863), American Union Army colonel
 Sydney Smith Haldimand Dickens (1847–1872), Royal Navy officer

Places
 Alnwick/Haldimand, a township in Ontario
 Haldimand County, a county with city status in Ontario
 United Counties of Lincoln, Welland and Haldimand, Ontario, a historical county

Electoral districts
 Brant—Haldimand, former federal electoral district in Ontario
 Haldimand (electoral district), federal district in Ontario
 Haldimand (Province of Canada electoral district)
 Haldimand (provincial electoral district)
 Haldimand and Monck, former federal district in Ontario 
 Haldimand—Norfolk, federal electoral district in Ontario
 Haldimand—Norfolk (provincial electoral district)
 Haldimand—Norfolk—Brant, former federal electoral district
 Norfolk—Haldimand, former federal electoral district

Buildings
 Château Haldimand, former building in Quebec City
 Haldimand County Museum & Archives
 Haldimand House, in Caledonia, Ontario

Military
 114th Battalion (Haldimand), CEF 
 The Dufferin and Haldimand Rifles of Canada
 The Haldimand Rifles

See also